Daniel Peev (born 6 October 1984) is a Bulgarian retired footballer who played as a left attacking midfielder. Daniel is also the younger brother of Georgi Peev.

Career
Daniel had short reigns at Lokomotiv Sofia and Levski Sofia. Later he joined Rodopa Smolyan where he played 4 years, making 83 appearances and scoring 14 goals.

Peev signed a two years contract with Pirin Blagoevgrad in July 2008. On 29 April 2009, he scored the only goal for his team in the 1:0 win against Levski Sofia in a 1/2 final of the Bulgarian Cup. During 2008-09 season, Peev became the only footballer who was able to score against all metropolitan teams - Levski Sofia, CSKA Sofia, Lokomotiv Sofia and Slavia Sofia. In his first season in Pirin, Peev earned 33 appearances, netting seven goals. In the first half of season 2009-10 he earned 15 appearances, netting four goals.

In December 2009, it was announced in the Bulgarian media that Slavia Sofia are having an interest in signing the midfielder to the club. On December 28, Slavia signed Peev for a two-a-half-year deal.

In 2012 he returned to Lokomotiv Sofia, helping the struggling team avoid relegation.

In January 2014, Peev relocated to Kazakhstan, signing a contract for one year with newly promoted Kazakhstan Premier League club Spartak Semey. Spartak Semey were relegated following the conclusion of the season and Peev joined Croatian club NK Osijek in February 2015.

On 20 June 2017, Peev signed with Vitosha Bistritsa. On 28 April 2018, he scored the only goal in the 1:0 victory over Cherno More Varna, helping the "tigers" from Bistritsa secure their first ever win in the top flight of Bulgarian football.

References

External links
 
 

1984 births
Living people
Footballers from Sofia
Bulgarian footballers
Bulgarian expatriate footballers
FC Lokomotiv 1929 Sofia players
PFC Levski Sofia players
PFC Rodopa Smolyan players
OFC Pirin Blagoevgrad players
PFC Slavia Sofia players
FC Spartak Semey players
NK Osijek players
FC Vitosha Bistritsa players
Expatriate footballers in Kazakhstan
Expatriate footballers in Croatia
First Professional Football League (Bulgaria) players
Kazakhstan Premier League players
Croatian Football League players
Association football midfielders